Nadiya Oleksandrivna Urzhumtseva (born 10 April 1982), better known by her stage name Nadia Meiher, is a Ukrainian singer-songwriter, actress, poet, television host and fashion designer.

Nadia Meiher came to regional media attention as a member of the girl group Nu Virgos (VIA Gra), being a member on three occasions, including in its "golden era" period from 2003 and 2004. Following her departure from the group in 2006, Nadia Meiher began working as a television host on STB. In 2014, she participated in the Russian version of Your Face Sounds Familiar, and launched her solo musical career releasing the single "Delo ne v tele".

Early life 
Nadia Meiher was born Nadiya Oleksandrivna Meikher in Zbruchivka, Volochysk Raion (then the Ukrainian SSR, the Soviet Union, now Ukraine), to father Oleksandr Pavlovych Meikher and mother Halyna Anatoliyivna Shchyrba. She is of Jewish and German descent through her father, and of Ukrainian descent through her mother. When Nadia Meiher was in school, her mother left to work in Italy, while Nadia Meiher stayed with her father. Her family then moved to Khmelnytskyi, where she studied music and dance.

Meiher then moved to Kyiv to study English at the Borys Grinchenko Kyiv University, and also began performing in a local theatre. In 2000, while performing in a theatre in Khmelnytskyi, she was noticed by Valery Meladze, who introduced her to producers Konstantin Meladze and Dmytro Kostyuk, who invited her to move to Kyiv and join the girl group Nu Virgos.

Career

2000–02, 2002–06, 2009–11: Nu Virgos 

Nadia Meiher was a member of the original line-up of Nu Virgos, along with Alena Vinnitskaya. Their debut single "Popytka No. 5" was released in 2000 and became a huge hit, where it was eventually named as one of the 99 biggest hits of Russian pop music in the period 1991–2011. The group's first studio album, also titled Popytka No. 5, sold over 700,000 units and earned Golden certification. In April 2002, Meikher temporarily left the group due to her pregnancy.

In September 2002, Meiher rejoined Nu Virgos, which now consisted of Meiher, Vinnitskaya, along with Anna Sedokova and Tatiana Naynik. Vinnitskaya and Naynik left the group shortly after, and were replaced by Vera Brezhneva. The period between January 2003 and September 2004, during which Nu Virgos consisted of Granovskaya, Sedokova and Brezhneva, has been considered "golden era" of the group. In January 2006, Meiher left Nu Virgos once again, in order to focus on her solo projects. She rejoined the group for the third time in 2009, replacing Meseda Bagaudinova, but left it once again in November 2011, due to pregnancy.

2006–present: Solo career 
From 2006 to 2008, Meiher hosted the STB television show Neymovirni istoriyi kokhannya (Incredible Love Stories) She co-hosted the 1+1 New Year 2007 programme, along with Svetlana Loboda and Ruslana Pysanka. In 2011, Meiher hosted the STB show Neymovirna pravda pro zirok (The Incredible Truth about the Stars). She also participated in the 1+1 show Zirka + Zirka in 2006, and in Odin v odin!; the Russian version of Your Face Sounds Familiar, in 2014. Meiher was also a part of the jury on the reality show Khochu do VIA Hry (I want to join Nu Virgos) in 2013, in which was created to find new members of Nu Virgos, as well as on the talent show Spivay yak zirka (Sing like a star) in 2015.

Meiher released her debut solo single, "Delo ne v tele", in May 2014. Her second single, "Tango vozvrasheniya", was released via iTunes in October the same year. She has since released two more singles, "Ostansya" (2015) and "Historia de un amor" (2016).

Meiher's first collection of poems "Siyuminutnoe vlechenie" (Momentary Attraction) was published in 2009. In 2016, Meiher opened the boutique Meiher by Meiher at the Gulliver centre in Kyiv, which sells her own designs.

Personal life 
Meiher has three children; son Ihor (born 15 August 2002) with her then-partner Oleksandr Lishenko, who was then the Deputy of the Kyiv City Council; and daughters Anna (born 23 March 2012) and Mariya (born 17 October 2015) with Russian businessman Mikhail Urzhumtsev, whom she married in 2014.

Discography

Singles 
 2014 — "Delo ne v tele"
 2014 — "Tango vozvrascheniya"
 2015 — "Ostansya"
 2016 — "Historia de un amor"

Filmography

Bibliography 
 Poetry collections
 Momentary Attraction (Siyuminutnoe vlechenie) (2009)

Awards and nominations

Notes

References

External links 
 Official Website
 Nadia Meiher on Facebook
 Nadia Meiher on Instagram
 Nadia Meiher on Twitter
 Nadia Meiher on YouTube

1982 births
English-language singers from Ukraine
Living people
Nu Virgos members
People from Khmelnytskyi Oblast
Russian-language singers
Ukrainian fashion designers
21st-century Ukrainian women singers
Ukrainian film actresses
Ukrainian Jews
Ukrainian people of German descent
Ukrainian people of Jewish descent
Ukrainian women poets
Ukrainian pop singers
Ukrainian television actresses
Ukrainian women fashion designers